There are around 79 villages in Kopargaon tehsil of Ahmednagar district of state of Maharashtra. Following is the list of village in Kopargaon tehsil.

A
 Anchalgaon
 Anjanapur
 Apegaon

B
 Bahadarabad
 Bahaderpur
 Baktarpur
 Bhojade
 Bolaki
 Bramhangbbaon

C
 Chandekasare
 Chandgavan
 Chasnali
 Chandaneshwar

D
 Dahegaon Bolaka
 Dauch Bk
 Dauch Kd
 Derde Chandvad
 Derde Korhale
 Dhamori
 Dharangaon
 Dhondewadi
 Dhotre

G
 Ghari
 Ghoegaon
 Godhegaon

H
 Handewadddi
 Hingani

J
 Jawalake
 Jeurkumbhari
 Jeurpatoda

K
 Kakadi
 Kanhegaon
 Karanji
 Karwadi
 Kasali
 Khirdiganesh
 Khopadi
 Kokamthan
 Kolagaonthadi
 Kolapewadi
 Kumbhar
 Kopargaon

L
 Louki

M
 Madhi Bk
 Madhi Kd
 Mahegaon Deshmukh
 Malegaonthadi
 Manegaon
 Manjur
 Mayegaondevi
 Morvis
 Murshatpur
 Malegaon

N
 Nategaon

O
 Ogadi

P
 
 Pohegaon Kd
  Tal.Kopargaon
  pin code.423605

R
 Ranjangaon Deshmukh
 Ravande

S
 Shahapur
 Suregaon
 Sanvatsar
 Sonari
 Sangvi Bhusar
 Sonewadi

T
 Takali
 Tilawani 
Talegaon Male

V
 Vadgaon
 Velapur
 Ukkadgaon

W
 Wari
 Wes

Y
Yesgaon

See also
 Kopargaon tehsil
 Tehsils in Ahmednagar
 Villages in Akole tehsil
 Villages in Jamkhed tehsil
 Villages in Karjat tehsil
 Villages in Nagar tehsil
 Villages in Nevasa tehsil
 Villages in Parner tehsil
 Villages in Pathardi tehsil
 Villages in Rahata tehsil
 Villages in Rahuri tehsil
 Villages in Sangamner tehsil
 Villages in Shevgaon tehsil
 Villages in Shrigonda tehsil
 Villages in Shrirampur tehsil

References

 
Kopargaon